Monardella viminea is a species of flowering plant in the mint family known by the common name willowy monardella.

It is endemic to coastal San Diego County, within the City of San Diego, in southern California. The plant is native to coastal sage scrub habitats of the California chaparral and woodlands ecoregion .

Conservation
Monardella viminea is a federal and state listed Endangered species, and a Critically Imperiled species on the California Native Plant Society Inventory of Rare and Endangered Plants. It is seriously threatened by urbanization, hydrological alterations, road improvements, vehicles, and invasive species of plants.

References

External links
 Calflora Database: Monardella viminea (Willowy monardella)
 Jepson Manual eFlora (TJM2) treatment of Monardella viminea
 The Nature Conservancy
 UC Photos gallery of Monardella viminea (willowy monardella)

viminea
Endemic flora of California
Natural history of the California chaparral and woodlands
Natural history of San Diego County, California
Taxa named by Edward Lee Greene